Chrysophila auriscutalis is a species of snout moth. It was described by Jacob Hübner in 1831. It is found in Brazilian state of Rio de Janeiro.

References

Moths described in 1831
Chrysauginae